Alcohol and sex deals with the effects of the consumption of alcohol on sexual behavior. The effects of alcohol are balanced between its suppressive effects on sexual physiology, which will decrease sexual activity, and its suppression of psychological inhibitions, which may increase the desire for sex.

Alcohol is a depressant. After consumption, alcohol causes the body's systems to slow down. Often, feelings of drunkenness are associated with elation and happiness but other feelings of anger or depression can arise. Balance, judgment, and coordination are also negatively affected. One of the most significant short term side effects of alcohol is reduced inhibition. Reduced inhibitions can lead to an increase in sexual behavior.

In men 
Low to moderate alcohol consumption is shown to have protective effect for men's erectile function. Several reviews and meta-analyses of existing literature show that low to moderate alcohol consumption significantly decrease erectile dysfunction risk.

Men's sexual behaviors can be affected dramatically by high alcohol consumption. Both chronic and acute alcohol consumption have been shown in most studies
 (but not all) to inhibit testosterone production in the testes.  This is believed to be caused by the metabolism of alcohol reducing the NAD+/NADH ratio both in the liver and the testes; since the synthesis of testosterone requires NAD+, this tends to reduce testosterone production.

As testosterone is critical for libido and physical arousal, alcohol tends to have deleterious effects on male sexual performance. Studies have been conducted that indicate increasing levels of alcohol intoxication produce a significant degradation in male masturbatory effectiveness (MME). This degradation was measured by measuring blood alcohol concentration (BAC) and ejaculation latency. Alcohol intoxication can decrease sexual arousal, decrease pleasureability and intensity of orgasm, and increase difficulty in attaining orgasm.

In women 
In women, the effects of alcohol on libido in the literature are mixed. Some women report that alcohol increases sexual arousal and desire, however, some studies show alcohol lower the physiological signs of arousal. A 2016 study found that alcohol negatively affected how positive the sexual experience was in both men and women. Studies have shown that acute alcohol consumption tends to cause increased levels of testosterone and estradiol. Since testosterone controls in part the strength of libido in women, this could be a physiological cause for an increased interest in sex. Also, because women have a higher percentage of body fat and less water in their bodies, alcohol can have a quicker, more severe impact. Women's bodies take longer to process alcohol; more precisely, a woman's body often takes one-third longer to eliminate the substance.

Sexual behavior in women under the influence of alcohol is also different from men. Studies have shown that increased BAC is associated with longer orgasmic latencies and decreased intensity of orgasm. Some women report a greater sexual arousal with increased alcohol consumption as well as increased sensations of pleasure during orgasm. Because ejaculatory response is visual and can more easily be measured in males, orgasmic response must be measured more intimately. In studies of the female orgasm under the influence of alcohol, orgasmic latencies were measured using a vaginal photoplethysmograph, which essentially measures vaginal blood volume.

Psychologically, alcohol has also played a role in sexual behavior. It has been reported that women who were intoxicated believed they were more sexually aroused than before consumption of alcohol. This psychological effect contrasts with the physiological effects measured, but refers back to the loss of inhibitions because of alcohol. Often, alcohol can influence the capacity for a woman to feel more relaxed and in turn, be more sexual. Alcohol may be considered by some women to be a sexual disinhibitor.

Drug facilitated sexual assault

Drug-facilitated sexual assault (DFSA), also known as predator rape, is a sexual assault carried out after the victim has become incapacitated due to having consumed alcohol or other drugs. The unofficial term "date rape drug" came into widespread usage in the early 1990s through U.S. news media reports. Researchers say that unlike other types of rape, DFSA is not a crime of physical violence: it is a crime of sexual hedonism and entitlement. A date rape drug, also called a predator drug, is any drug that can be used to assist in the execution of drug facilitated sexual assault (DFSA). The most common types of DFSA are those in which a victim ingested drugs willingly for recreational purposes, or had them administered surreptitiously: it is the latter type of assault that the term "date rape drug" most often refers to.

Sexual risk-taking
Alcohol intoxication is associated with an increased risk that people will become involved in risky sexual behaviours, such as unprotected sex. It is unclear whether the two are linked or the personality types of people who often drink large amounts of alcohol are more tolerant of risk-taking.

Alcohol is linked to a large proportion of unwanted outcomes associated with sex such as date rape, unwanted pregnancy and sexually transmitted diseases.

In 2018 the first study of its kind, found that alcohol and caffeinated energy drinks is linked with casual, risky sex among college-age adults.

"Beer goggles"

A study published in 2003 supported the beer goggles hypothesis; however, it also found that another explanation is that regular drinkers tend to have personality traits that mean they find people more attractive, whether or not they are under the influence of alcohol at the time.  A 2009 study showed that while men found adult women (who were wearing makeup) more attractive after consuming alcohol, the alcohol did not interfere with their ability to determine a woman's age.

See also

 Sex and drugs

References

Bibliography

Alcohol
Human sexuality
Sex and drugs